Evale Futebol Clube is an Angolan football club from Evale, a village in the southern province of Cunene. They currently play in Gira Angola the Angolan Second Division after being promoted from the Angola Provincial Stage.

Stadium
Currently the team plays at the Estádio Municipal dos Castilhos in Cunene's capital city of Ondjiva.

League & Cup Positions

Players

Manager history

See also
 Girabola

External links
Girabola Profile
Jornalo des Sportos2012
Jornalo des Sportos2013

References

Football clubs in Angola
Sports clubs in Angola